BMQ may refer to:

 Basic Military Qualification, the recruit training that is undergone to produce non-commissioned members of the Canadian Forces
 The FAA Location Identifier for Burnet Municipal Airport
 British Museum Quarterly, a scholarly journal